

Rolf Scherenberg (27 May 1897 – 10 June 1961) was a German general (Generalmajor) in the Wehrmacht during World War II.  He was a recipient of the Knight's Cross of the Iron Cross of Nazi Germany.

Scherenberg surrendered to the Red Army in the course of the Soviet Upper Silesian Offensive in May 1945. Convicted as a war criminal in the Soviet Union, he was held until October 1955.

Awards and decorations

 German Cross in Gold (19 December 1941)
 Knight's Cross of the Iron Cross on 26 March 1943 as Oberst and commander of Grenadier-Regiment 532

References

Citations

Bibliography

 

1897 births
1961 deaths
Military personnel from Berlin
Major generals of the German Army (Wehrmacht)
Prussian Army personnel
Recipients of the clasp to the Iron Cross, 1st class
Recipients of the Gold German Cross
Recipients of the Knight's Cross of the Iron Cross
German prisoners of war in World War II held by the Soviet Union
People from the Province of Brandenburg